Tabanus fairchildi is a species of horse fly in the family Tabanidae.

Distribution
Canada, United States.

References

Tabanidae
Insects described in 1938
Diptera of North America